The Killera Sword is a demo album of the Brazilian heavy metal band Viper, released in 1985.

Tracks 
 "Law of the Sword" - 04:38
 "Signs of the Night" - 03:59
 "Nightmare" - 04:25
 "H.R. (Heavy Rock)" - 03:11
 "The Whipper" - 05:36	
 "Killera The Princess Of Hell" - 02:54

1985 albums
Viper (band) albums